Daniel João Santos Candeias (born 25 February 1988) is a Portuguese professional footballer who plays as a winger for Turkish club Alanyaspor.

He was on the books of both Porto and Benfica, where he was mostly loaned out, and amassed most of his 134 Primeira Liga appearances and 15 goals while at Nacional. He also played over 100 games in the Turkish Süper Lig with Alanyaspor and Gençlerbirliği, and had spells in Spain, Germany, France and Scotland.

Club career

Porto
Born in Fornos de Algodres, Guarda District, Candeias started his professional career with FC Porto in the 2008–09 season, after emerging through the club's youth ranks and having served a loan at Varzim S.C. in the Segunda Liga. He made his official debut for the former in late August, in the 2–0 defeat to Sporting CP in the Supertaça Cândido de Oliveira.

After having appeared scarcely throughout his first year (also playing ten minutes in the 4–0 loss against Arsenal in the group stage of the UEFA Champions League), Candeias was loaned in late January to league strugglers Rio Ave FC, until the end of the campaign. For 2009–10 another loan ensued, as he moved to Recreativo de Huelva in the Spanish Segunda División.

However, after a few months during which he appeared infrequently, Candeias returned to Portugal in late January 2010 to join F.C. Paços de Ferreira, again on loan. His first match for his new team was a 1–2 home loss against G.D. Chaves in the quarter-finals of the Taça de Portugal. His maiden appearance in the Primeira Liga for them occurred on 7 February, as he featured 12 minutes of the 2–1 away victory over Vitória de Guimarães.

Nacional
In October 2010, Candeias moved to C.D. Nacional in the same league on a co-ownership deal. He was immediately loaned to Portimonense SC, appearing regularly as a starter but suffering top-flight relegation.

Upon returning to Funchal, Candeias made his debut in the UEFA Europa League second qualifying round against Fimleikafélag Hafnarfjarðar of Iceland; he came on as a late substitute in the second leg on 21 July 2011 and scored to conclude a 2–0 win (3–1 aggregate). He netted 15 more goals for the side, including the winner with his first touch from the bench in a 2–1 comeback against C.S. Marítimo in the Madeira derby on 21 April 2013, and the opener of a win of the same score against his former club Porto the following 30 March, in which he also assisted the decider by Mario Rondón at the Estádio da Madeira.

Benfica
On 3 July 2014, Candeias signed for Portuguese champions S.L. Benfica, promising to "give everything" for the club. He failed to appear in any competitive games, however, being successively loaned to 1. FC Nürnberg in Germany, Granada CF in Spain, FC Metz in France and Alanyaspor in Turkey.

Rangers
On 11 June 2017, Candeias joined Scottish club Rangers on a two-year deal, for a reported transfer fee of £700,000. He made his debut 18 days later, playing 31 minutes in a 1–0 home win over FC Progrès Niederkorn in the UEFA Europa League.

Candeias scored his first goal for his new team on 9 August 2017, in a 6–0 rout of Dunfermline Athletic in the Scottish League Cup. He netted in an Old Firm game on 11 March 2018 to give Rangers a 2–1 lead in a 3–2 loss to Celtic at Ibrox Park; three days later, he extended his contract until the summer of 2020.

Return to Turkey
On 22 July 2019, Candeias signed a two-year contract at Gençlerbirliği S.K. of the Turkish Süper Lig. His three goals of his first season in Ankara were all scored on 19 October in a 6–0 win at Antalyaspor, in which he added two assists to his hat-trick.

Having suffered relegation, Candeias returned to Alanyaspor on a deal of the same length in June 2021. Accompanying compatriots José Marafona, Wilson Eduardo and João Novais, he scored his first goal of his new spell away to Galatasaray S.K. on 19 September, coming off the bench to decide the game with three minutes remaining.

International career
After having made his Porto debut in 2008, Candeias was soon called up to the Portugal under-21 team. He won his first cap on 5 September of that year, coming on as a 58th-minute substitute for Vieirinha in a 2–0 away loss to England for the 2009 UEFA European Championship qualifiers.

Career statistics

Honours
Porto
Primeira Liga: 2008–09
Taça de Portugal: 2008–09

References

External links

1988 births
Living people
People from Fornos de Algodres
Sportspeople from Guarda District
Portuguese footballers
Association football wingers
Primeira Liga players
Liga Portugal 2 players
FC Porto players
Varzim S.C. players
Rio Ave F.C. players
F.C. Paços de Ferreira players
Portimonense S.C. players
C.D. Nacional players
S.L. Benfica footballers
La Liga players
Segunda División players
Recreativo de Huelva players
Granada CF footballers
2. Bundesliga players
1. FC Nürnberg players
Ligue 2 players
FC Metz players
Süper Lig players
Alanyaspor footballers
Gençlerbirliği S.K. footballers
Scottish Professional Football League players
Rangers F.C. players
Portugal youth international footballers
Portugal under-21 international footballers
Portuguese expatriate footballers
Expatriate footballers in Spain
Expatriate footballers in Germany
Expatriate footballers in France
Expatriate footballers in Turkey
Expatriate footballers in Scotland
Portuguese expatriate sportspeople in Spain
Portuguese expatriate sportspeople in Germany
Portuguese expatriate sportspeople in France
Portuguese expatriate sportspeople in Turkey
Portuguese expatriate sportspeople in Scotland